Barbadian may refer to:

 anything related to Barbados
 Barbadians, people from Barbados or of Barbadian descent
 Afro-Barbadians
 Barbadian Americans
 Barbadian Brazilians
 Barbadian British
 Barbadian Canadians
 White Barbadian
 Culture of Barbados
 Cuisine of Barbados
 English in Barbados

See also 
 List of Barbadians
 Bajan (disambiguation)
 

Language and nationality disambiguation pages